Catocala agitatrix is a moth of the family Erebidae. It is found in the Russian Far East (Primorye, Khabarovsk, Southern Amur), China, Korea, Japan (Hokkaido, Honshu).

The wingspan is about 62 mm.

Subspecies
Catocala agitatrix agitatrix
Catocala agitatrix kobayashii Ishizuka, 2010 (Japan: Hokkaido)
Catocala agitatrix shaanxiensis Ishizuka, 2010 (China: Shaanxi)

References

 , 2010: Notes on Catocala agitatrix Graeser, 1888 [1889] group (Lepidoptera, Noctuidae). Tinea 21(3): 161-170.

External links
Catocala of Asia

Moths described in 1889
agitatrix
Moths of Asia